Willerstedt is a village and a former municipality in the Weimarer Land district of Thuringia, Germany. Since 31 December 2013, it is part of the municipality Ilmtal-Weinstraße.

References

Former municipalities in Thuringia
Grand Duchy of Saxe-Weimar-Eisenach